18000 may refer to:

Railway vehicles 

 British Rail 18000 - a prototype gas turbine-electric locomotive built for British Railways in 1949 
 Tokyo Metro 18000 series - an electric multiple unit train type 
 TCDD DE18000 - a type of diesel-electric locomotive built for Turkish State Railways

Other 

 ISO/IEC 18000 - an international standard that describes RFID technologies 
 18,000 BCE - a year in pre-history
 18,000 - a number
 18000 - a minor planet